Emanuel Marcel Lucien Balsa (January 1, 1909 in Creuse – August 11, 1984 in Maisons-Alfort) was a French racing driver.

Balsa started in racing after World War II, when he acquired a Bugatti Type 51 and became quite competitive in the French national events. He later built a BMW-engined Formula 2 car, and had a good reputation, until he tried a Jicey-BMW developed by Jean Caillas.
With it he finished third in the Grand Prix of Cadours, the same event where fellow racer Raymond Sommer was killed. He returned to his previous race car and in 1952 raced in the German Grand Prix at the Nürburgring, only to retire after six laps. In 1953 he won a race at Montlhery but then faded from the racing scene.

Complete Formula One World Championship results
(key)

References 

1909 births
1984 deaths
Sportspeople from Creuse
French racing drivers
French Formula One drivers